Maklakov is a Russian masculine surname, its feminine counterpart is Maklakova. It is derived from the Russian  word maklak (маклак), petty broker.  It may refer to
Aleksei Maklakov (born 1962), actor and singer
 Nikolay Maklakov (1871-1918), politician, younger brother of
Vasily Maklakov (1869–1957),  trial lawyer

See also
Maklakiewicz

Russian-language surnames
Occupational surnames